The battle of Tlatempa took place on July 5, 1859 in the vicinity of Zacatlán in the state of Puebla, Mexico, between elements of the liberal army, under General Juan N. Mendez and conservative elements of the army commanded by General Carlos Oronoz who was the commander Zacatlán military during the War of Reform. The battle ended as liberal victory, leaving in a very compromising situation to General Miramon because this was amagado the south with the forces of Ignacio Zaragoza, in the north by Jesus Gonzalez Ortega and from the east by Santos Degollado.

References

1859 in Mexico
Conflicts in 1859
Reform War